(The Black Mask) is an opera by composer Krzysztof Penderecki using a German libretto by the composer and Harry Kupfer which is based on a 1928 play by Gerhart Hauptmann. The opera premiered at the Salzburg Festival on 15 August 1986, after which there were productions mounted at the Vienna State Opera and the Great Theatre, Warsaw during the following opera season. The work had its United States premiere on 30 July 1988 at the Santa Fe Opera with a cast that included Mark Lundberg.

Roles

References

German-language operas
Operas by Krzysztof Penderecki
Operas
1986 operas
Operas based on plays